David Ernest James (born in Sydney in 1958) is a cell biologist who discovered the glucose transporter GLUT4. He has also been responsible for the molecular dissection of the intracellular trafficking pathways that regulate GLUT4 translocation to the cell surface, the topological mapping of the insulin signal transduction pathway, the creation of a method for studying in vivo metabolism in small animals, and the use of this method to gain insights into whole-animal fuel metabolism and homeostasis.

In 1979 he graduated with a BSc (Hons) from the University of New South Wales, and gained his Ph.D. at the Garvan Institute of Medical Research in 1985. Subsequently he pursued postdoc research at Boston University and Washington University in St. Louis in the USA. In 1993 he returned to Australia, first to Brisbane and then once again at the Garvan Institute. In 2014 he moved to the University of Sydney.

He currently holds joint appointments as the Leonard P Ullmann Chair in Molecular Systems Biology and as the Domain Leader for Biology at the Charles Perkins Centre at The University of Sydney.

Awards and honours
 1993–1997: Wellcome Trust Research Fellowship
 1999: Glaxo Wellcome Australia Medal
 2000: Mary Kugel Award for services to the Juvenile Diabetes Foundation
 2006: Kellion Award from the Australian Diabetes Society
 2007: Fellow of the Australian Academy of Science
 2008: Millennium Award, Diabetes Australian Research Trust
 2014: ANZCDBS President’s Medal
 2016: NSW Premier’s Prize for Medical Research
 2020: Australian Laureate Fellowship

See also
GLUT 4
Charles Perkins Centre
University of Sydney

References

External links 
 Professor David James, University of Sydney
 Metabolic Cybernetics Lab
 Charles Perkins Centre

Australian biologists
Living people
1958 births
Fellows of the Australian Academy of Science
Academic staff of the University of Sydney
Garvan Institute of Medical Research alumni
University of New South Wales alumni
Academic staff of the University of New South Wales